Sky Murder is a 1940 detective film starring Walter Pidgeon as detective Nick Carter in his third and final outing for MGM as Nick Carter. The film was part of a trilogy based on original screen stories starring the popular literary series character. In the heightened tensions prior to World War II, Hollywood produced many films in the spy film genre such as Sky Murder.

Sky Murder followed Phantom Raiders (1940) and the first film in the series, Nick Carter, Master Detective (1939) and led to Sky Murder, the last of the Nick Carter series.

Plot
Old friend Cortland Grand summons private detective Nick Carter and his friend "Beeswax" Bartholomew to Washington for as meeting with Senator Monrose, who heads a committee investigating subversive groups in the U.S. Nick turns down the Senator's request to assist his committee, and flies back to New York on Cortland's personal aircraft. Joining Nick on the flight are six beautiful models accompanied by their chaperone, detective Christine Cross, and Andrew Hendon, a polo star suspected of being a spy.

Upon landing, Hendon is discovered murdered with a nail file belonging to model Pat Evens, in his throat. More ominously, three spies wait on the landing strip are intent on silencing Pat and getting in the cockpit, they strangle the pilot. Nick take over, bringing the passengers to Cortland's country house, where he interrogates Pat when machine gun fire hits the house. Bartholomew is dressed in Pat's robes to fool the killers, allowing Nick and Pat to make a getaway.

After leaving in the sheriff's car, Nick and Pat are arrested. When they are locked up, the spies plant a bomb with Pat and Nick again narrowly missing being killed. They take refuge in Cortland's New York apartment where Pat tells Nick that the spies had been threatening to kill her father, held captive in Europe. As Pat confesses, Bartholomew and Christine trace the spies to their hideout behind a printer's shop, but they are taken prisoner.

Sending Pat to stay in a small hotel, Nick contacts Senator Monrose and realizes that Cortland is likely the leader of the third column spies. Nick locates Bartholomew by following his bees butd when he goes to rescue his assistant, Kathe, one of Cortland's spies, kidnaps Pat.

After rescuing Bartholomew and Christine, Nick alerts the police, who arrest the spies and free Pat. Setting a trap for Cortland, Nick and the Senator board his aircraft, and after Nick tricks him into a confession, Cortland dies in a shootout.

Cast

Production
Production on Sky Murder began on July 24, 1940. A Douglas DC-2 in scale model form is seen in the film.

Reception

Box office
According to MGM record, Sky Murder earned $270,000 in the US and Canada and $167,000 elsewhere, making a profit of $64,000.

Reviews
Film reviewer Bosley Crowther, in his The New York Times review of Sky Murder, wrote: "Let a Hollywood producer launch a film series and very shortly the stories, as they appear, become as formalized as Chinese checkers. The Nick Carter mysteries are no exception ... Through it all Nick is magnificently careless. Though sudden death lurks outside the window pane, he never pulls a shade. When seconds count, he saves one to pinch a cutie's cheek. When lesser men quail, he lights a cigarette. As usual, he wins his game in a welter of comic-strip heroics. But, as we were suggesting, it's a little like playing checkers with an opponent whose tricks became familiar long ago".

Film historian and reviewer Leonard Maltin called Sky Murder an "above-average private-eye yarn".

Film historian John Douglas Eames in The MGM Story: The Complete History Of Fifty Roaring Years (1975) described Pigeon's recurring role as sleuth Nick Carter in Sky Murder, "a 'melo'".

References

Notes

Citations

Bibliography

 Eames, John Douglas. The MGM Story: The Complete History Of Fifty Roaring Years. London: Octopus Books, 1975. .
 Pendo, Stephen. Aviation in the Cinema. Lanham, Maryland: Scarecrow Press, 1985. .
 Quinlan, David. Quinlan's Film Stars. Washington, D.C.: Brassey's, 2000. .

External links
 
 
 
 

1940 films
Metro-Goldwyn-Mayer films
1940 drama films
American aviation films
American drama films
Nick Carter (literary character)
American black-and-white films
Films directed by George B. Seitz
1940s English-language films
1940s American films